Beacon Designer designs highly specific and efficient primers and probes for real-time PCR (polymerase chain reaction) assays. It is compatible to work on Windows as well as on Mac. The software currently supports the following real-time PCR chemistries for efficient primer and probe design. 

 SYBR Green
 TaqMan
 Molecular beacon
 HRMA Primers
 Scorpions 
 FRET
 LNA (Locked nucleic acid)
 NASBA

Beacon Designer program has built-in support for homology avoidance using the standard web BLAST service or the set-up of a desktop BLAST feature for the identification of regions that are significantly cross-homologous with the target gene sequence. The software designs real-time PCR primers and probes for complex differential gene expression and allele discrimination assays. Avoidance of the cross homology renders specificity to the primers in question and they are highly targeted and only amplify the intended sequence and no other targets.

Beacon Designer has been used in workshops and conferences related to real-time PCR study as a reference software.

The author's company, Premier Biosoft has also launched a simple version for evaluation of oligos for real time PCR primers and probes (support limited to TaqMan and SYBR Green primers) by the name Beacon designer free version.

External links
Beacon Designer Homepage
Beacon Designer Free Edition
High-Resolution Melt

Bioinformatics software